Zhang Guozhu may refer to:
Chang Kuo-chu (born 1948), Taiwanese actor
Kuo-Chu Chang, electrical engineer
Cheung Kwok-che (born 1951), Hong Kong politician